Kurda was an ancient city-state and kingdom located in Northern Mesopotamia. Kurda emerged during the Early Dynastic Period (Mesopotamia) and is attested in the administrative texts of this era as a city state and geographical territory in Upper Mesopotamia corresponding to modern northern Iraq. The city-state of Kurda is again attested by the Akkadian king Naram Sin in 23rd century BCE in his military campaigns in the land of Subarians. Various  Archives of Mari around 18th century BCE mention Kurda as an independent Kingdom, sometimes in alliance with Babylon and sometimes allied with Mari. Kurda is also mentioned in the Tell Fekheriye tablets of the Assyrian kings Šalmaneser I (1263–1234 BC) and Tukulti-Ninurta I (1233–1198 BC), as one of the conquered territories in the Mitannian Empire.

Location
At its height the kingdom might have stretched from the Upper Khabur basin in what is today north-eastern Syria, to the steppes of Sinjar mountain, modern north-western Iraq. The capital city's location is debated; it was either located to south of Sinjar mountain, or along the Khabur river.

Population and history
The city was the Amorite Numha tribe's center, it controlled a small area and included the nearby city of Kasapa. The east Semitic deity Nergal was Kurda's chief god.

In the 18th century BC, Kurda was involved in a military dispute with the neighboring kingdom of Andarig, which ended in peace. However, Kurda was later subdued by Andarig and its master, the king of Elam. The kingdom tried switching its loyalty to Babylon but was stopped by the Elamites who were defeated by a Babylonian-Mariote alliance in 1764 BC, giving Kurda the chance to form an alliance with the kingdom of Apum to face Andarig. 
Kurda annexed the city of Ashihum, then became a vassal of Babylon, and ended its relation with Mari in response to the latter role in supporting Andarig.

Rulers

See also

 Mari, Syria
Andarig
Eshnunna
Amorite language
 Babylon
Assyria

References

Citations

Former populated places in Iraq
Ancient Mesopotamia
History of Kurdistan
Amorite cities
City-states
Former kingdoms